Vincaminol (C20H26N2O2) is a chemical that is a part of the Vinca alkaloid group, which were discovered in the 1950s by a Canadian scientist and are derived from Vinca minor (periwinkle). Vincaminol is not as well known as some of the other Vinca alkaloids such as vinblastine, vinorelbine, vincristine, and vindesine, which are the four main, medically useful Vinca alkaloids.

Uses
Vincaminol is used in to synthesize vincamine.

References

Vinca alkaloids
Tryptamine alkaloids
Quinolizidine alkaloids